Jerry Schatzberg (born June 26, 1927) is an American photographer and film director.

Career
Schatzberg was born to a Jewish family of furriers and grew up in the Bronx. He photographed for magazines such as Vogue, Esquire and McCalls. He made his debut as a feature film director with 1970's Puzzle of a Downfall Child starring Faye Dunaway. He went on to direct films such as The Panic in Needle Park, which starred Al Pacino in 1971, Scarecrow, which shared the grand prize at the 1973 Cannes Film Festival, The Seduction of Joe Tynan, Honeysuckle Rose with Willie Nelson, Misunderstood (based on a novel by Florence Montgomery) and Street Smart in 1987 which earned Morgan Freeman his first Oscar Nomination.

He was a member of the jury at the 2004 Cannes Film Festival.

As a still photographer, one of Schatzberg's most famous images was the cover photo of the Bob Dylan album Blonde on Blonde, released in 1966. A collection of Schatzberg's images of Dylan was published by Genesis Publications in 2006, titled Thin Wild Mercury.

Personal life
Schatzberg was divorced in Cd. Juárez, Mexico in 1968 following eleven years of separation from wife Corinne, who had refused to end the marriage after having lived together for five years. The couple had two children. At the time of the divorce, Schatzberg was widely known as Faye Dunaway's fiancé, but Dunaway left Schatzberg for actor Marcello Mastroianni in 1968. Schatzberg's marriage to French American actress Maureen Kerwin in 1983 ended in divorce in 1998.

Filmography

Film

Television

References

External links
 Official website
 
 An interview with Jerry Schatzberg Festival Lumière, October 2011

1927 births
Living people
20th-century American Jews
American photographers
People from the Bronx
Directors of Palme d'Or winners
Film directors from New York City
Photographers from the Bronx
21st-century American Jews